Super City is a New Zealand television comedy series starring Madeleine Sami and directed by Taika Waititi. Season 1 premiered on the TV3 network in 2011. The series was picked up as a comedy presented by the American Broadcasting Company in 2012. The series opened with a healthy 24 percent share of the 25-54 age bracket, earning it 11th place on TV3's rating table for the week. The second season, directed by Oscar Kightley, premiered on 26 July 2013.

Overview

In Season 1, Madeleine Sami transforms into five different characters, all living in Auckland. Pasha is an aging cheerleader clinging to her partying lifestyle; Azeem is an immigrant taxi driver embracing Maori culture; Jo is a gym instructor in love with her best friend; Linda is the runt of her "old girls" clique fostering impoverished artists and Georgie is a homeless girl whose freedom is unexpectedly interrupted.

In Season 2, Madeleine transforms into young Levi Tutaima, a  20-year-old Niuean who's keen on making his way as a semi-professional rugby star but is  concerned with getting his hair right and fitting in. Then there's 26-year-old Ofa Faka'apa'apa, a benefit case-manager who's got little sympathy for those who need state help and is always ready with some unorthodox advice. Next is Mary Dalziel who, at 45, might not be on the path to pop stardom anymore, but that won't stop her from awkwardly flirting her way around the local covers band scene. And then there's Ray Donaldson, a 62-year-old British panel beater who does his best to teach his immigrant employees while also supporting his bodybuilder wife Tiffany. Plus there are some excellent character roles from Urzila Carlson as Ofa's manager and Elroy Finn playing Mary's son.

Episodes
There are six episodes in the show's first season:

Awards
Madeleine Sami won Best Performance by an Actress at the 2011 Aotearoa Film & Television Awards (previously Qantas TV and Film Award). The series was a finalist in two other categories; Best Comedy, Best Script.

Madeleine Sami & Thomas Sainsbury also picked up Best Comedy Script for Episode 3 at the 2011 SWANZ awards.

Reception
"Madeleine has an extraordinary ability to flit from character to character… She uses it to explore and have a good laugh at various aspects of "being" Auckland. This is funny, this is funny, its smart and sharp." – Simon Wilson, Metro Magazine

"Sami absolutely nailed these characters... Very cleverly layered. Its a very good mix of comedy and tragedy. I'm disappointed its a 6 episode season and we're halfway through. Its definitely definitely worth watching." - Sarah McMullan, National Radio

"I applaud Super City, think it's very clever… Sami produces a medley of five very different Auckland stereotypes, obviously demonstrates her clever acting abilities and broad range." - Jane Bowron, Dominion Post

"Have you been watching Super City? Well you should be. Its shows an Auckland like you never see on TV and have genius observations and characters, great lines and its surprising and fresh. And it is funny too. So, good." - Simon Pound

References

2010s New Zealand television series
2011 New Zealand television series debuts
2013 New Zealand television series endings
English-language television shows
New Zealand comedy television series
Television shows filmed in New Zealand
Television shows funded by NZ on Air
Television shows set in Auckland
Three (TV channel) original programming